NLO (acronym for Невероятное, Легендарное, Очевидное (Incredible, Legendary, Obvious)) was a Russian magazine about ufology , paranormal phenomena and history published by Kaleydoskop publishing house. First published in 1994 as a newspaper, the publication shifted to a magazine format in 1998. The editorial board included prominent Russian ufologist Vladimir Azhazha.

The magazine format is A4. The publication repeatedly changed its design and logo, being a newspaper, magazine and, most recently, a newspaper-like magazine. According to the Russian National Print Run Service, NLO's stated print run of 200,000 has been inflated, being three times higher than the actual one (64,337).

References

1994 establishments in Russia
Publications established in 1994
Paranormal magazines
Weekly magazines published in Russia
Russian-language magazines
Magazines established in 1998